Jerry Emmett Patterson (born November 15, 1946) is an American politician who served as the commissioner of the Texas General Land Office from 2003 to 2015. A former state senator, he was the second Republican since Reconstruction to serve as land commissioner, a post which he held for three terms. He served from the Houston area in District 11 in the Texas Senate from 1993 to 1999.

Patterson did not immediately seek a fourth term as land commissioner. He was instead an unsuccessful Republican candidate for Lieutenant Governor of Texas in the primary election held on March 4, 2014, losing to Dan Patrick. In 2018, he ran again for land commissioner, losing to incumbent George P. Bush in the Republican primary.

Early life and education
Patterson was born to Jerry Patterson and the former Georgia Lee Scheaffer in Houston. He graduated from Texas A&M University in 1969 with a Bachelor of Arts degree in history.

Career 
In 1972, he volunteered for duty in Vietnam. He was later designated a naval flight officer in Pensacola, Florida, and he served in Marine fighter squadrons until his retirement from the Marine Corps Reserve as a Lieutenant Colonel in 1993.

In 1984, Patterson ran for Texas' 25th congressional district. He faced freshman Democratic Representative Michael A. Andrews and lost, 64 to 36 percent.

In 1992, Patterson won election to the Texas Senate, serving from 1993 to 1999. During his tenure, he introduced a successful bill to allow concealed carry of firearms. A 2012 New York Times article described Patterson regularly wearing a gun on his ankle and a second in the small of his back.

In March 1998, Patterson lost the Republican primary for land commissioner to David Dewhurst, also from Houston. Dewhurst led with 265,363 votes (51.2 percent). Patterson trailed with 216,250 votes (41.7 percent), and a third candidate, Don Loucks, held the remaining 36,706 votes (7.1 percent).

In the 2002 Republican primary for Texas land commissioner, Patterson defeated Kenn George of Dallas, a member of the Texas House of Representatives from District 108 and an assistant United States Secretary of Commerce in the administration of U.S. President Ronald W. Reagan. In the general election, Patterson was opposed by Democratic State Senator David Bernsen of Beaumont. Patterson defeated him with 53.2% of the vote to Bernsen's 41.5%. In April 2003, Patterson was sworn into office, succeeding his one-time primary rival David Dewhurst; Dewhurst had left office to successfully run for Lieutenant Governor of Texas.

In 2010, Patterson entered into a highly public dispute with Texas State Representative Wayne Christian over an amendment Christian had introduced to rebuild his vacation home after Hurricane Ike. Patterson threatened to force the legislature to impeach him before he would enforce the provision, telling the Houston Chronicle, "My option is just to say, 'Screw you, Wayne Christian,' because the Legislature didn't pass this, one guy passed this."

Race for lieutenant governor

In July 2011, Patterson announced that he would run for lieutenant governor in 2014. Patterson in 2012 endorsed three-term incumbent Lieutenant Governor David Dewhurst, who ran for the United States Senate. However, Dewhurst was defeated by former Texas Solicitor General Ted Cruz in the Republican primary runoff election on July 31, 2012.

In his race for lieutenant governor, Patterson polled 165,787 votes (12.5 percent) and ran last among the four candidates. A runoff election was held on May 27, 2014 between the top votegetter and the successful nominee with 41.5 percent of the ballots cast, Dan Patrick, a state senator and radio talk show host from Houston, and the incumbent David Dewhurst, who finished a weak second at 28.3 percent. In third place at 17.8 percent was the departing Agriculture Commissioner Todd Staples of Palestine, Texas. After his last place finish, Patterson dumped a ton of opposition research on Patrick to the media, including medical records.

Patterson carried the endorsement of former U. S. Representative Ron Paul, twice an unsuccessful candidate for the Republican presidential nomination. At a candidate forum in College Station, Patterson described himself as "the liberty guy", or one who trusts individuals, rather than government, to make decisions in their interest.

Later campaigns
Patterson said that even had he won, the 2014 race would have been his last campaign because he is "more concerned about the next generation [than] ... about the next election."

In 2015, he considered but decided against a run for an open seat on the Texas Railroad Commission, citing the likely electoral backlash against his personal opposition to Republican presidential frontrunner, Donald Trump.

In 2018, he ran for another term in his previous position, Texas Commissioner of the General Land Office. He opposed incumbent George P. Bush, a grandson of President George H. W. Bush, in the Republican primary. Patterson charged that Bush's agency had repaired only two homes in the months following Hurricane Harvey and criticized his plan to renovate the Alamo historic site. Politifact rated Patterson's criticism of Bush's Hurricane Harvey recovery efforts as "Mostly True" but an "oversimplification." Bush outraised Patterson significantly, with more than $1.5 million in campaign contributions to Patterson's $107,000. Bush defeated Patterson and two other candidates in the March 6, 2018 primary. Bush received 58.2% of the vote to Patterson's 29.7%, avoiding a run-off.

Western States Land Commissioners Association
In August 2007, Patterson was named president of the Western States Land Commissioners Association, an organization that consists of 23 states that together manage  of land, mineral right properties, and land beneath navigable waterways.

The association was formed in 1949. The group seeks to help states maximize earnings from trust lands and share information regarding natural resource management in the American West.

Personal life 
Patterson resides in Austin and has four children: twins Samantha and Cole, born in 2004, and, from a previous marriage, Emily Patterson and Travis Patterson. Emily Patterson is a graduate of the South Texas College of Law and works for the OSCE as a Human Rights Officer in Kosovo. Travis Patterson graduated from Texas A&M University in College Station, where he was commissioned a Marine second lieutenant. He served on active duty as a Marine attack helicopter pilot.

On June 5, 2007, Patterson was named "Texan of the Year" by Celebrate Texas, a nonprofit organization dedicated to raising public awareness of Texas history.

Electoral history

See also

References

External links
1992 - 2006 Election History (Texas Secretary of State Website)
Patterson campaign website
Texas General Land Office

1946 births
Living people
Commissioners of the General Land Office of Texas
Republican Party Texas state senators
Texas A&M University alumni
United States Marine Corps officers
Military personnel from Houston
People from Austin, Texas
United States Marine Corps reservists